The 2020–21 Algerian Ligue Professionnelle 1 was the 59th season of the Algerian Ligue Professionnelle 1 since its establishment in 1962. A total of 20 teams contested the league. The Ligue Professionnelle 1 kicked off on 28 November 2020.

Teams
20 teams contested the league. RC Relizane, Olympique de Médéa, JSM Skikda and WA Tlemcen were promoted from the 2019–20 Ligue 2.

Stadiums
Note: Table lists in alphabetical order.

Personnel and kits

Managerial changes

Foreign players

League table

Results

Positions by round

Clubs season-progress

Season statistics

Leader week after week

The bottom of the table week after week

Top scorers

Updated to games played on 28 August 2021 Source: soccerway.com

Hat-tricks

4 – Player scored four goals.

Clean sheets

Media coverage

See also
2020–21 Algerian Ligue 2

Notes

References

Algerian Ligue Professionnelle 1 seasons
1